Hôpital de Verdun is a hospital in Montreal, Quebec, Canada. It is located at 4000 LaSalle Boulevard in the borough of Verdun.

Background
The hospital was designed by Alphonse Venne in an Art-Deco style, built between 1930 and 1931 and then opened in 1932, it now employs 1,600 people. It is affiliated with the Université de Montréal Faculty of Medicine.

Services
It is a general hospital, specializing in family medicine. It provides services in cardiology, nephrology, pneumology, neurology, general surgery, orthopedic surgery, urology, oncology, gastroenterology and ophthalmology.

References

External links
CSSS du Sud-Ouest - Verdun

Hospital buildings completed in 1931
Hospitals in Montreal
Verdun, Quebec
Art Deco architecture in Canada
Hospitals established in 1932
Université de Montréal
1932 establishments in Quebec